The CFP franc (French: , called the franc in everyday use) is the currency used in the French overseas collectivities (or COM) of French Polynesia, New Caledonia, and Wallis and Futuna. Its ISO 4217 currency code is XPF. The CFP franc is subdivided into 100 centimes.

History

1945–1949 

The CFP franc was created in December 1945, together with the CFA franc, used in Africa. The reason for the creation of these francs was the weakness of the French franc immediately after the Second World War. When France ratified the Bretton Woods Agreement in December 1945, the French franc was devalued in order to set a fixed exchange rate with the US dollar. New currencies were created in the French colonies to spare them the strong devaluation of December 1945. René Pleven, the French minister of finance, was quoted saying: "In a show of her generosity and selflessness, metropolitan France, wishing not to impose on her far-away daughters the consequences of her own poverty, is setting different exchange rates for their currency." The other French colonial currencies were set at a fixed exchange rate with the French franc. However, the CFP franc was set at a fixed exchange rate with the US dollar, which played a major role in the economy of the French Pacific territories on account of World War II. That situation ended in September 1949 when the CFP franc was given a fixed exchange rate with the French franc.

1949–1985 
The CFP franc has been issued by the IEOM ('Overseas Issuing Institute') since 1967. The IEOM has its headquarters in Paris.

The currency was initially issued in three distinct forms for French Polynesia, New Caledonia and the New Hebrides. (See French Polynesian franc, New Caledonian franc and New Hebrides franc.) Wallis and Futuna used the New Caledonian franc. Although the banknotes of the New Hebrides bore the name of the territory, the notes of French Polynesia and New Caledonia could only be distinguished by the name of the capitals (Papeete and Nouméa, respectively) on the reverse of the notes.

In 1969, the New Hebrides franc was separated from the CFP franc and was replaced by the Vanuatu vatu in 1982.

Since 1985 

The new highest denomination 10,000 CFP franc banknote (€83.80) issued on 1 October 1986, was the first one that was not overprinted with a city name. The 500 franc banknote, issued in 1992, and the 1,000 and 5,000 franc banknotes, issued in 1995, are also without the overprint. The designs of the 500, 1,000, and 5,000 franc banknotes did not change until 2014, when new designs and sizes were introduced.

Today, all banknotes are strictly identical from New Caledonia to French Polynesia. One side of the banknotes shows landscapes or historical figures of French Polynesia, while the other side of the banknotes shows landscapes or historical figures of New Caledonia.

The coins are still separated in two sets: one side of the coins is identical from New Caledonia to French Polynesia, while the other side of the coins is inscribed with the name  in New Caledonia and in Wallis and Futuna, and with the name  in French Polynesia. Both sets of coins can be used in all three French territories. The situation of the CFP coins is thus quite similar to that of the euro coins, which have a national side but can be used in all countries of the eurozone.

An ordinance of September 15, 2021, which entered into force on February 26, 2022, defines the name CFP franc as the "franc of the French communities of the Pacific".

Historical exchange rates 
 December 26, 1945 to September 20, 1949 – Fixed exchange with the US dollar at US$1 = F.CFP 49.60. Non-fixed exchange rate with the old French franc, which devalued four times vs. the US dollar. From F.CFP 1 = FF 2.40  (FF = French franc) in December 1945, the exchange rate reached F.CFP 1 = FF 5.50 in September 1949.
 September 21, 1949 to December 31, 1959 – Fixed exchange rate with the old French franc at F.CFP 1 = FF 5.50
 January 1, 1960 to December 31, 1998 – Fixed exchange rate with the French franc at F.CFP 1 = NF 0.055 or NF 1 ≈ F.CFP 18.182 (January 1, 1960: 100 'old' French francs became 1 'new' franc)
 January 1, 1999 onward – Fixed exchange rate with the euro at F.CFP 1,000 = €8.38 or €1 ≈ F.CFP 119.332 (January 1, 1999: euro replaced FRF at the rate of 6.55957 FRF for 1 euro)
The value of 1000 XPF in euros was instead rounded to the nearest euro cent upon the introduction of the euro.

The 1960 and 1999 events are merely changes in the currency in use in France; the relative value of the CFP franc (XPF) vs. the French franc / euro is unchanged since 1949.

Coins 
In 1949, New Caledonia and what was then called French Oceania (now French Polynesia) began to issue coins. The coins have been separated in two types: the obverses are identical, whilst the reverses are distinct. Both types of coins can be used in all three French territories. The situation of the CFP coins is thus quite similar to that of the euro coins, which have a national side but can be used in all countries of the euro zone.

The New Hebrides franc had a different history of coin issuance before being replaced by the Vanuatu vatu in 1982.

The IEOM circulates in the French Pacific Colonies have two sets of metal coins with a face value of 1, 2, 5, 10, 20, 50, and 100 francs. The first series runs mainly in New Caledonia and Wallis and Futuna, the second in French Polynesia, although both series have distinct legal tender in each of the regions.

Each piece – consisting of copper, nickel, magnesium or aluminum – is designed by: first an obverse depicting a landscape, a fruit, an animal or a sculptural typical of the area, the name of the territory associated with the series, and the denomination on the other hand a reverse contained an allegorical representation (Minerva, goddess of wisdom or portrait of Marianne, symbol of the Republic), the initials of the bank issuing central (IEOM), the vintage (corresponding to the year of manufacture) and the words "French Republic" with a slight of the aspect is smooth or fluted.

Values 1, 2, and 5 franc coins have aluminium and magnesium in both sets. 10, 20, and 50 francs only have a nickel composition, meaning it was completely made of nickel until 2005, then copper nickel. The 100 Franc was made of nickel bronze until 2005, and from 2006 copper, nickel, and aluminum.

Starting 1 September 2021, a new set of coins were issued, common to all 3 French Pacific Territories. 1 Franc & 2 Francs coins will disappear and a brand new 200 Francs coin will be available.

Banknotes 
The IEOM began issuing banknotes in New Hebrides in 1965, and in New Caledonia and French Polynesia in 1969. On 1 October 1986, a new banknote, the 10,000 francs, was introduced which did not bear any distinguishing mark and was common to both French Polynesia and New Caledonia. These were followed, between 1992 and 1995, by 500, 1,000, and 5,000 franc notes for all of the French Pacific Territories.

The overall design has not changed since 1969. One side shows landscapes or historical figures of New Caledonia, while the other side of the banknotes shows landscapes or historical figures of French Polynesia.

On January 6, 2014, the IEOM unveiled designs for a new series of banknotes. The new notes were issued on January 20. The older issues ceased circulation on September 30 of that year, but can be exchanged indefinitely at the Institut d'émission d'outre-mer offices.

Tārā 
Before the French regulated the currency on Tahiti, French Polynesia, traders often used dollars.  The word dollar became  (often written without accents as tara, or tala), and this term is still used among native Tahitian and local Chinese traders as an unofficial unit, worth 5 francs. Thus for a price of 200 francs, one would say  (40 tārā) in Tahitian. The currency of Samoa is also called the tālā.

See also 
 CFA franc
 Currencies related to the euro
 French Polynesian franc
 Monetary union
 New Caledonian franc
 New Hebrides franc

References

External links 
 

Currencies introduced in 1945
Currency unions
Fixed exchange rate